Feng'en zhenguo gong (Manchu: ᡴᡝᠰᡳ ᠪᡝᡨᡠᠸᠠᡴᡳᠶᠠᡵᠠᡤᡠᡵᡠᠨ ᠪᡝᡩᠠᠯᡳᡵᡝᡤᡠᠩ, Möllendorf: kesi-be tuwakiyara gurun-be dalire gung), translated as "Grace Defender Duke" or "Duke Who Guards the State by the Grace" or "State Duke of the First Rank", was one of the royal and noble titles of the Qing dynasty. A title was created in 1653 by division of the zhenguo gong title into two ranks following the criterium of sharing Eight Privilleges. The title was the seventh highest rank in the extended system of ranks and the fifth inheritable rank.

Rules of grant 
The title could be granted to the son of Prince of the First Rank born to Primary Princess Consort of the First Rank. The son of Primary Princess Consort of the First Rank could be further promoted until he reached the father's title (iron-cap peerage). The title was usually the lowest possible to inherit in the peerage of the First Rank except of special circumstances. The title could also convey a honorifical name consisting of two characters. The title could be made perpetually inheritable in case of abolition of the peerage.

The title could be also granted to the son of Prince of the Fourth rank born to Primary Princess Consort of the Fourth Rank.

Family members

Princess consort 
Princess consort was styled as "feng'en zhenguo gong furen" (奉恩鎮國公夫人), which translates to "State Duchess of the First Rank". Often the title was replaced by the term Primary Wife (嫡妻).

Sons 
Son of the feng'en zhenguo gong was granted a title of feng'en fuguo gong (奉恩輔國公, translated as: "grace bulwark duke" or "State Duke of the Second Rank"). The son of feng'en zhenguo gong born to mistress was given a title being two ranks lower.

Daughters 
Daughter born to primary consort of feng'en zhenguo duke was granted a title of Lady of the Third Rank (鄉君). Daughters born to secondary consort of feng'en zhenguo gong was granted a title of sixth rank clanswoman.

Allowances and court attire

Feng'en zhenguo gong

Allowance 
The allowance of grace defender duke reached 700 taels of silver and 700 hu of rice.

Attire 

 Mandarin hat with ruby-inlaid finial decorated with two dragons and 5 pearls (winter) or 1 turquoise and 1 pearl (summer) and two-eyed peacock feathers
 Surcoat with two mandarin squares embroidered with four-clawed dragons
 Court dress befitting prince of the third rank
 Golden yellow girdles with dark blue pendants and square-shaped jade decorations
 Court beads with dark blue strings
 Fur coat made of the sable fur and trimmed with clair de lune colour satin

State duchess of the first rank

Attire 

 Crown decorated with 3 peacocks each embellished with three pearls, finial with 5 pearls and ruby and 3 strings of pearls connected with two lapis lazuli inlaid plaques
 Diadem decorated with 5 ruyi cloud shaped plaques bejeweled with pearls and 3 strings of pearls connected with two lapis lazuli inlaid plaques
 Formal and semiformal robes befitting princess consorts of the third rank
 Surcoat embroidered with 8 roundels of flowers according to the luoshu pattern (2 circles on the shoulders, two circles on the breast and back respectively and 4 roundels on the bottom

Xiangjun

Allowance 
The basic allotment of xiangjun reached 40 taels and 40 hu of rice. As most of the ladies of the third rank were married off, the allowance included 40 taels and 5 rolls of fabrics. Xiangjun (title) was allowed to have 4  personal maids and 2 bodyguards.

Attire 

 Crown and diadem befitting state duchess of the second rank
 Court robes befitting princess consort of the third rank
 Semiformal robes befitting state duchess of the first rank

Notable titles 
The following table includes the titles conveying honorifical names.

References 

 
Chinese royal titles